The Argovian Formation is a geologic formation in France. It preserves fossils dating back to the Jurassic period.

See also 
 List of fossiliferous stratigraphic units in France

References 

Geologic formations of France
Geologic formations of Switzerland
Jurassic System of Europe
Jurassic France
Jurassic Switzerland